Fengtian is a railway station on the Taiwan Railways Administration Hualien–Taitung line located in Shoufeng Township, Hualien County, Taiwan.

History
The station was opened on 1 May 1913.

Around the station
 Taiwan Hospitality and Tourism University

See also
 List of railway stations in Taiwan

References

1913 establishments in Taiwan
Railway stations in Hualien County
Railway stations opened in 1913
Railway stations served by Taiwan Railways Administration